Dora Siliya (born October 8, 1970 , Kitwe ) is a politician in Zambia. She is  the former member of parliament for Petauke Central and the former Minister of Communication and Broadcasting.

Early Years 
She was born in Kitwe and went to school in Mufulira . After graduating Kabulonga Girls secondary school in 1988, she commences her studies at the University of Zambia where she studied medicine. After two years, she left the University and began working at Zambian Television and Radio (ZNBC), then went back to university to study mass communication, while still employed at ZNBC. In 1996 she started work at the South African Broadcasting Corporation. In 1997 she graduated with a BA. She holds a Masters Degree in Development Economics from Cambridge University in the United Kingdom.

Career 
Siliya became Television Controller , working directly with Duncan Mbazima, who was the Director-General. She left ZNBC and was employed in a European Union project of Private Sector Development for two years. In 2001, she was approached by the Movement for Multiparty Democracy to run for the National Assembly, which she did in Petauke. She was not successful and was transferred to the Zambian embassy in Cairo working for the deputy ambassador and was mainly devoted to trade relations. In 2006, she reappeared as parliamentary candidate for the MMD in Petauke. She once served as the Minister of Energy and Water Development, Minister of Agriculture, and Minister of Transport and Communication. On 14 February 2018, she was appointed by president Edgar Chagwa Lungu to become the Minister of information and subsequently the chief government spokesperson.

On 23 May 2020, Siliya tested positive for COVID-19.

Politics 
Siliya was elected to the National Assembly in Zambia in 2006 in the constituency of Petauke-Central . In October 2006 she was appointed Deputy Minister of Economy, Trade and Industry.

References

1970 births
Women government ministers of Zambia
Movement for Multi-Party Democracy politicians
Patriotic Front (Zambia) politicians
University of Zambia alumni
Alumni of the University of Cambridge
Living people